"Flava" is a song by English-Australian singer Peter Andre, released as the fifth single from his second studio album, Natural (1996). It includes a rap by American rapper Cee. The song spent one week at number one on the UK Singles Chart in September 1996, becoming Andre's first number-one single in the UK. "Flava" also reached top 10 in Denmark, the Netherlands, New Zealand, Sweden, and the Wallonia region of Belgium.

Critical reception
British magazine Music Week rated the song four out of five, writing, "Matching Mysterious Girl is going to be tough, but Flava has a warm R&B sound, a catchy chorus and enough class to become another winner."

Track listings
7-inch and cassette single
 "Flava" (7-inch edit)
 "To the Top"

European and Australian CD1
 "Flava" (radio 7-inch edit) – 4:01
 "Flava" (Benz Mix) – 4:05
 "Flava" (Richie P Mix) – 4:01
 "Flava" (Crichton & Morris 12-inch Mix) – 6:18

European and Australian CD2
 "Flava" (radio 7-inch edit) – 4:01
 "Flava" (Slammin' 12-inch) – 6:49
 "Flava" (Crichton & Morris 7-inch Mix) – 4:41
 "Flava" (Jungle Mix) – 5:10

Charts

Weekly charts

Year-end charts

Certifications

References

1996 singles
1996 songs
Mushroom Records singles
Number-one singles in Scotland
Peter Andre songs
Songs written by Peter Andre
Songs written by Wayne Hector
UK Singles Chart number-one singles